The following is a list of the television networks and announcers who have broadcast college football's Holiday Bowl throughout the years.

Television

On June 15, 2017, it was revealed that the Holiday Bowl had not renewed its contract with ESPN—one of the network's longest relationships—and had entered into an agreement to move to FS1 beginning 2017.

On June 24, 2021, Fox Sports announced the bowl would move from FS1 to Fox. However, the 2021 game was never played due to the Covid-19 pandemic.

Radio

References

Holiday
Broadcasters
Holiday Bowl
Holiday Bowl
Holiday Bowl